The 2022 Crawley Borough Council took place on 5 May 2022 to elect members of Crawley Borough Council. This is on the same day as other local elections. 12 of the 36 seats were up for election.

Background
In its first election in 1973, Crawley was won by Labour. Their control of the council continued until 2006, when the Conservatives took control. Labour regained the council in 2014, and this continued until the 2021 election, when the Conservatives became the largest party, although Labour continued to govern in coalition with an independent. In that election, the Conservatives gained 1 seat with 48.6% of the vote, Labour lost one seat with 39.5%, and independents made no gains or losses with 0.9%.

The seats up for election in 2022 were last elected in 2019 due to boundary changes. In that election, Labour won 19 seats with 42.6%, and Conservatives won 17 with 42.6%.

Previous council composition

Results

Council composition after election

Results by ward
An asterisk indicates an incumbent councillor.

Bewbush and North Broadfield

This seat was won from an independent who had defected from Labour since his last election.

Broadfield

Furnace Green

Ifield

Langley Green and Tushmore

Maidenbower

Northgate and West Green

Pound Hill North and Forge Wood

Pound Hill South and Worth

Southgate

Three Bridges

Tilgate

References

Crawley
Crawley Borough Council elections